Abu Ahmad Yahya ibn Ali ibn  Yahya ibn Abi Mansur Aban al-Monajjem (b. 241/855-56, died in 13 Rabi' I 300/29 October 912) was a medieval Persian music theorist, literary historian and poet. He belonged to the family of Banu Munajjem, a family of Iranian descent, associated with the Abbasid court for more than two centuries. His father 'Alī ibn Yaḥyā al-Munajjim (died 888) was a student of the renowned musician Ishaq al-Mawsili.

He is mainly famous for a treatise on music, Resāla fi’l-mūsīqī  written for Al-Mu'tadid. His other famous work, of equal importance, is a compilation of biographies with some poetry named Ketāb al-bāher fī aḵbār šoʿarāʾ moḵażramī al-dawlatayn. He was highly praised by Al-Marzubani as a decent poet. He was well-versed in Arabic language, and he it is said that he wrote many books, though even the name of those books are not known today.

References

Persian Arabic-language poets
9th-century Persian-language poets
10th-century Persian-language poets
9th-century Persian-language writers
10th-century Persian-language writers
Iranian music theorists